South Coast is an album by American folk musician Ramblin' Jack Elliott, released in 1995. It was his first new studio release in over 20 years.

At the Grammy Awards of 1996, South Coast won the Grammy Award for Best Traditional Folk Album.

Reception

Writing for Allmusic, music critic Burgin Matthews wrote the album "Elliott also reveals himself as one of the few truly enduring figures of the folk era, partly because his music is more honest, and as a result more timeless, than so much of that era's music... With South Coast, Elliott's legend is irrevocably cemented."

In popular culture
The song "Pastures of Plenty" is featured in Ari Gold's 2008 film Adventures of Power.

Track listing 
"Pastures of Plenty" (Woody Guthrie) – 2:46
"If I Were a Carpenter" (Tim Hardin) – 5:00
"Cocaine Blues" (Reverend Gary Davis) – 2:29
"I Ain't Got No Home" (Guthrie) – 2:07
"Will James" (Ian Tyson) – 2:16
"The Buffalo Skinners (On the Trail of the Buffalo)" (Traditional) – 5:24
"Rake and Ramblin' Boy" (Derroll Adams) – 2:26
"South Coast" (Lillian Bos Ross) – 7:53
"Talkin' Dust Bowl" (Guthrie) – 3:03
"Mean Old Bed Bug Blues" (Joe Davis) – 3:23
"Ludlow Massacre" (Guthrie) – 4:25
"San Francisco Bay Blues" (Jesse Fuller) – 2:14

Personnel
Ramblin' Jack Elliott – vocals, guitar
Production notes:
Bob Feldman – producer
Brent Sigmeth – engineer
Chris Frymire – editing, pre-mastering  
Eric Peltoniemi – associate producer, editing, mixing, pre-mastering  
Paul Baron – mixing  
David Glasser – mastering  
Linda Beauvais – artwork, design  
Michael Crouser – photography

References

1995 albums
Ramblin' Jack Elliott albums